Potters Resort is a modern five star holiday village in Hopton-on-Sea, Norfolk near the border with Suffolk. Potters was the first permanent holiday camp in the United Kingdom, opening its doors for the first time in 1920. Over a century on and through four generations of the Potter Family, it remains the last privately owned holiday village of its kind and in 2002, became the first to receive the English Tourist Board's five star award for holiday villages, since held for 20 consecutive years.

Potters Resort is the venue for the annual World Indoor Bowls Championships.

History 

In 1913, solicitors' clerk Herbert Potter won £500 in a Sunday Chronicle newspaper competition. Inspired by the friendly camaraderie he enjoyed himself when visiting holiday camps with tents, he made plans to build his own. He was called up to serve in World War I and after surviving the trenches and the Battle of the Somme, he returned and purchased land in nearby Hemsby which was the original site of the first permanent and mixed use holiday camp in the UK. Herbert and his brother Arthur Potter opened in 1920 with wooden huts as standard.

Upon moving down the coast to bare land in Hopton-on-Sea in 1924, the original Hemsby site was sold. The proceeds were split with Arthur moving to Cornwall, himself establishing Duporth Holiday Camp. Potters remained in its new location by the railway line in Hopton-on-Sea for 10 years, run by Herbert and his wife Edith. During this pioneering decade, many other holiday camps were established along the Norfolk and Suffolk coast, a total of 14 within a 10-mile radius of Hopton-on-Sea, five of which were in the village itself. In 1934, Herbert left the operation of the camp to his daughter Rosa and her new husband, Lesley Groom. Groom, the local policeman, having purchased a third site from Mr Colman who himself operated a successful mustard business. This third plot was in a seaside location as was becoming the trend. Herbert Potter promoted both sites at this time, although the camp located at the railway was later renamed 'Grooms'. The seaside camp known then as Hopton Beach Camp and operated by Herbert and son Hector Potter, is where Potters Resort currently remains.

During World War II many holiday camps were requisitioned by the army and the buildings and huts at Potters were mostly dismantled for firewood to keep soldiers warm in the winter. Following the war many of those pioneering families were unable to reopen their holiday camps. Herbert, along with son Hector and his wife Vera, set about rebuilding the camp. Their son Brian was a small child at the time, born shortly before the war began in 1940.

In the celebratory period following the war, there was a resurgence in British seaside holidays. Potters once again became a thriving holiday camp having re-invested in its facilities, including building one of the first outdoor swimming pools on the east coast in 1958. Its success was challenged again in the 1960s by the overseas package holiday, during which time many remaining holiday camps closed in the face of stiff competition from sunnier alternatives. With Brian Potter becoming more involved in the family business with partner Judy, Potters again re-invested, creating more indoor facilities to counteract the challenges of the British weather. During this time, fourth generation Jane and John were born to Brian and Judy Potter in 1967 and 1969 respectively, their names chosen via guest votes.

In the 1970s and 1980s cheaper, self-catering holidays emerged, one of the first being nearby Hopton Holiday Village. During this wave of competitive new business models, Potters redefined its offerings. Throughout this third generation, led by Brian and Judy Potter, that the resort grew from a seasonal, family holiday camp to a unique leisure resort with shows and cabaret style entertainment nightly, with inclusive meals, daytime entertainment and a range of leisure and sports facilities.

Remaining wooden chalets had been replaced by brick bungalows, the outdoor swimming pool became an indoor health and fitness club, a new entrance and reception area was created along with a large sports hall. Professional entertainment was heavily invested in, offering a unique selling point and allowing Potters to expand their season. Despite the resort's first ever weekend break falling upon the great storm of 1987 with guests having to be moved to neighbouring sites due to maintenance issues, further breaks were added to the calendar and ongoing investment continued.

In 1993, the Bowlers Bar was built along with six indoor bowls rinks, in addition to the two original rinks built in the 1980s. Ten Pin bowling was added in 1994. Between 1996 and 1998 the resort's main facilities were changed for the long term future. The Bamboo Bar was razed and replaced by the Terrace Bar, The Gallery Lounge and International Arena (with a further six bowls rinks). During the resort's closed period in 1996 and 1997 respectively, the old theatre and restaurant were demolished, replaced by the Atlas Theatre in 14 weeks, and the Garden Restaurant in 12 weeks.
 
The sport of bowls became a key part of Potters' year-round success, with thousands of retired holidaymakers enjoying the combination of this social sport whilst holidaying in the typically quieter seasons. As Potters' link with bowls grew, so did their investment in the sport and subsequently their relationship with the World Bowls Tour. In 1999 the resort hosted the World Indoor Bowls Championships for the first time, having moved from its long standing home in Preston. The event remains at Potters today with many thousands flocking to Hopton-on-Sea for 17 days in January. 1999 was first year that Potters Resort was open year-round, and saw the opening of the Hotel with 86 rooms.

Brian's son John Potter became managing director in 2000 and the re-investment continued throughout the next decade with the introduction of outdoor bowls rinks, an activity centre, bungalow and Palms refurbishment, Hotel and Atlas Theatre extensions and improvements as well as the opening of Zest, Potters' conferencing and events centre hosting weddings, conferences and corporate events. It is thought that a total of £49m was invested in the resort between 1988 and 2013.

In 2004, Potters Holidays was launched offering packages in  Paphos, Cyprus. Some years later, Potters No Fly Cruising was launched with any cruise available to book from any UK port.

The period had its challenges. The Bowlers Bar was flooded in September 2007 following record rainfall. In November 2008 the laundry and maintenance workshop was destroyed by a fire.

In 2013, Brian Potter was awarded with an MBE for his long service in the tourism industry. The resort was renamed to its current name, Potters Resort (from Potters Leisure Resort) with the new strapline 'Quality Time Together'. Brian Potter MBE died in November 2014, In his memory, the Potter Family formed the Potters Friends Foundation in December 2014 to help local worthy causes, continuing his legacy and charitable efforts.

By summer 2015, Palms Health & Fitness had a full refurbishment, a new Reception area and Bowlers Bar update. The GameZone was added with Ten Pin Bowling and children's play area.

In 2016, John Potter co-created the Customer Happiness Score, a software platform and business ideology based on customer happiness

Facilities

Restaurants 
Potters Resort has a number of dining venues for visitors. Guests staying on resort will typically eat breakfast, lunch and evening meal in the Garden or Gallery Restaurants, and have the option of a midnight dish in the Terrace Bar. is available Wednesday to Sunday and, whilst separate from the main complex, is on resort. This is a popular restaurant where guests can order their starter and dessert from the menu. The main course of various meats and fish and a number of side dishes is brought tableside along with a volcanic hot rock, on which guests cook to their taste. Guests can also eat at the Sunday Carvery in Zest

The Atlas Theatre 
The Atlas Theatre is the venue for evening entertainment, open all year. The facility has a retractable stage, rear stage projection, two large stage screens, and live band visibility. In 2011 The Atlas Theatre was extended with construction during the day and overnight, to avoid interrupting the evening's show. The theatre now has downstairs and balcony seating for over 1,000 guests and bars on both levels. The downstairs bar is approximately 100 feet long. The Potters Theatre Company perform here nightly, except when a star act is on the bill. The Atlas Theatre is also often used for conferences and events.

Bars 
In addition to the Atlas Theatre, guests can make use of the Bowlers Bar, Gallery Lounge and Terrace Bar, in any of which there may be daytime activities and late night entertainment.

Sports & Leisure 
Guests can use many facilities including Palms Health & Fitness, with two swimming pools, a sauna, steam room and fully equipped gym. Aphrodite and The Hair Studio are adjacent, offering beauty treatments and products. Sports at Potters Resort include golf, tennis, bowls, squash, table tennis, badminton, archery and more. Potters has a full daytime programme which includes quizzes, demonstrations and classes.

Accommodation

Bungalows 
Potters Resort was the UK's first permanent holiday camp, with visitors staying in timber huts as opposed to other camps which were mostly under canvas. Over time the outside accommodation has developed through wooden chalets to brick rooms, to the present day, where guests stay in a choice of 260 bungalows, catering for parties of all sizes.

Hotel 
Potters Resort expanded in 1999, building hotel rooms on vacant land around the existing facilities. Originally 86 rooms, this was extended in 2010, adding 26 rooms. Rooms vary from Premier Rooms to Penthouse Suites.

References

External links

Holiday camps
Great Yarmouth
1920 establishments in England